Kings Mountain State Park is a South Carolina state park located in the Piedmont region of South Carolina.

This large hilly park includes the Living History Farm, which is representative of a typical early 19th-century Piedmont farm. It includes a barn, cotton gin, blacksmith, and carpenter shop.

The park also surrounds  Lake York as well as the smaller Lake Crawford.

The park has connecting trails to the adjoining Kings Mountain National Military Park and Crowders Mountain State Park.

History 

 of this park were donated in 1934 by the U.S. Government. An additional  were donated and purchased in 1995. The park was largely developed by the Civilian Conservation Corps. The Kings Mountain State Park Historic District was named to the National Register of Historic Places in 2008.

Fees 
 Admission, $3 adults; $1.50 SC seniors; $1 children age 6-15; age 5 & younger free
 Camping, $17 – $22 per day
 Fishing boat rentals, $10.00 per half day & $20.00 per full day

Nearby state parks
The following state parks and state forests are within  of Kings Mountain State Park:
Croft State Park
Crowders Mountain State Park, North Carolina
Mountain Island Educational State Forest, North Carolina
South Mountains State Park, North Carolina

See also 
 Open-air museum
 List of South Carolina state parks
 National Register of Historic Places listings in South Carolina

References

External links 
 Park Finder site
 SCiway site

State parks of South Carolina
Museums in Cherokee County, South Carolina
Farm museums in South Carolina
Living museums in South Carolina
Civilian Conservation Corps in South Carolina
Protected areas of Cherokee County, South Carolina
1934 establishments in South Carolina
National Register of Historic Places in Cherokee County, South Carolina
Historic districts on the National Register of Historic Places in South Carolina